Wohratal is a municipality in Marburg-Biedenkopf district in Hessen, Germany.

Geography
Wohratal lies between the Kellerwald (forest) in the east and the Burgwald, a low mountain range, in the west, on the river Wohra.

Among the bigger neighbouring centres are the towns of Frankenberg an der Eder to the northwest and Kirchhain to the south.

Neighbouring municipalities
In the north, Wohratal borders on the towns of Rosenthal and Gemünden, both in Waldeck-Frankenberg district, in the east on the community of Gilserberg in Schwalm-Eder district, and on Rauschenberg, also in Marburg-Biedenkopf district, in the south and west.

Constituent communities
The community consists of four centres: Wohra, Hertingshausen, Halsdorf and Langendorf.

Politics

As of the municipal elections on 26 March 2006, the seats on Wohratal's council are apportioned thus:

SPD 7 seats
CDU 5 seats
Greens 2 seats
UWG (citizens' coalition) 1 seat

References

External links
Wohratal's official website
Homepage of Wohratal-Halsdorf

Marburg-Biedenkopf